Antony "Tony" Oliver Ward Stretton is a neuroscientist, faculty member of the Neuroscience Training Program, and the John Bascom Professor of Zoology at the University of Wisconsin–Madison.  He is married to fellow scientist, Philippa Claude, daughter of Albert Claude.

Stretton worked with Vernon M. Ingram first in the United Kingdom at the Cavendish Laboratory of the University of Cambridge then in the United States at the Massachusetts Institute of Technology as well as with Edward A. Kravitz at the Medical School of Harvard University.  He has also done research at the Marine Biological Laboratory in Woods Hole, Massachusetts.

Honors and awards
Distinguished Teaching Awards: Chancellor's Award, University of Wisconsin–Madison (2007)
Fellow, American Association for the Advancement of Science

Selected publications
Ingram, V. M. and A. O. W. Stretton, (1959)  "Genetic basis of the thalassaemia diseases", Nature, 184:1903-1909.[CrossRef][Medline]
Ingram, V. M. and A. O. W. Stretton, (1961)  "Human haemoglobin A2: chemistry, genetics and evolution", Nature 190:1079-1084
Ingram, V. M. and A. O. W. Stretton, (1962)  "Human haemoglobin A2. I. Comparisons of haemoglobins A2 and A", Biochim. Biophys. Acta 62:456-474
Ingram, V. M. and A. O. W. Stretton, (1962)  "Human haemoglobin A2. II. The chemistry of some peptides peculiar to haemoglobin A2", Biochim. Biophys. Acta 63:20-33
Stretton A.O., Kravitz E.A., (1968), "Neuronal geometry: determination with a technique of intracellular dye injection", Science, 162: p. 132-4. Science 4 October 1968: Vol. 162. no. 3849, pp. 132 – 134
Stretton A.O.W. (2002) "The First Sequence: Fred Sanger and Insulin", Genetics, Vol. 162, 527-532, October 2002,
Stretton, A. O. W., Ph.D. Thesis, Univ. Cambridge (1960)

Notes

References

http://www.zoology.wisc.edu/faculty/Stre/Stre.html
https://web.archive.org/web/20080719041823/http://ntp.neuroscience.wisc.edu/faculty/stretton.html
http://www.news.wisc.edu/13686
https://web.archive.org/web/20110720114703/https://www.mbo.wisc.edu/SpecialProfessorships/NamedProfsFY8ByApp.pdf
https://web.archive.org/web/20081020092613/http://www.hms.harvard.edu/bss/neuro/kravitz/currentmember/Ed.html
Ingram V.A. "Sickle-Cell Anemia Hemoglobin: The Molecular Biology of the First "Molecular Disease"—The Crucial Importance of Serendipity", Genetics, Vol. 167, 1-7, May 2004
Ingram, Father of Molecular Medicine, Dies at 82.

https://web.archive.org/web/20090111164922/http://sickle.bwh.harvard.edu/ingram.html
https://web.archive.org/web/20090422003709/http://ntp.neuroscience.wisc.edu/resource/alumni/alumni.html
http://www.zoology.wisc.edu/grad/Gradlist.htm
http://www.wormbase.org/resources/person/WBPerson630
https://web.archive.org/web/20070816100323/http://neuroethology.org/newsletter/news_archive/isn.news.mar00.htm
http://janus.lib.cam.ac.uk/db/node.xsp?id=EAD%2FGBR%2F0272%2FKC%2FKCAC%2F1%2F2%2F6%2F1%2FStretton

Living people
American neuroscientists
University of Wisconsin–Madison faculty
Year of birth missing (living people)
Alumni of the University of Cambridge